Kentzlin is a municipality in the Mecklenburgische Seenplatte district of Mecklenburg-Vorpommern, Germany.

References

Municipalities in Mecklenburg-Western Pomerania
Mecklenburgische Seenplatte (district)